Restless Feeling is a blues album by Carl Weathersby. It was released in 1998 on the Evidence Records label. It was produced by John Snyder and recorded May 11–15, 1998 at Dockside Studios in Maurice, Louisiana.

Track listing
"Matchbox Holds My Clothes" (Albert King) - 5:00
"A Real Mutha Fuh Ya" (Johnny "Guitar" Watson) - 6:23
"It's You That I Want" (Rico McFarland) - 4:44
"Restless Feeling" (Carl Weathersby) - 4:44
"Woman Song" (Carl Weathersby) - 4:02
"Wheel Of Fortune" (Steve Nails/Victor Palmer/Alan Wiley) - 4:00
"We All Wanna Boogie" (Allen Toussaint) - 4:07
"Meadville, Mississippi" (Carl Weathersby) - 3:47
"Everything I Do" (Carl Weathersby) - 3:50
"Rhymes" (Al Green/Mabon Hodges) - 3:22
"Tired Of Being Alone" (Rico McFarland/Mike Gray) - 4:32
"Glory Be" (Sam Hopkins/Clarence Lewis/Morgan Robinson) - 4:16
"She's Gone" (Rico McFarland) - 4:09

Personnel
 Carl Weathersby - vocals, electric & acoustic guitar
 Rico McFarland - electric & acoustic guitar, lead vocal on "Tired Of Being Alone", background vocals
 David Torkanowsky - Hammond B-3 organ, piano, keyboards
 Dave Smith - bass
 Steve Potts - drums
 Juanita Brooks - background vocals

References

1998 albums
Carl Weathersby albums
Evidence Music albums